Don Juan's Three Nights also known as Don Juan's 3 Nights is a 1926 American silent romantic drama film directed by John Francis Dillon and starring Lewis Stone, Shirley Mason, and Malcolm McGregor. It was produced by Henry Hobart and distributed through First National Pictures.

The film is preserved in the Library of Congress collection and at the Wisconsin Center for Film and Theater Research in Madison.

Cast
 Lewis Stone as Johann Aradi
 Shirley Mason as Ninette Cavallar
 Malcolm McGregor as Giulio Roberti
 Myrtle Stedman as Madame Cavallar
 Betty Francisco as Madame de Courcy
 Kalla Pasha as Monsieur de Courcy
 Alma Bennett as Carlotta
 Natalie Kingston as Vilma Theodori
Mario Carillo as Count di Bonito
 Jed Prouty as Lippi
 Madeline Hurlock as Louise Villate
 Gertrude Astor as Baroness von Minden

See also
Gertrude Astor filmography

References

External links

 
 

1926 films
American silent feature films
Films directed by John Francis Dillon
First National Pictures films
Films based on Hungarian novels
American romantic drama films
1926 romantic drama films
American black-and-white films
Films with screenplays by Gerald Duffy
1920s American films
Silent romantic drama films
Silent American drama films